Ángel Sánchez may refer to:

People in association football
Ángel Sánchez (footballer, born 1982), Spanish manager and former player
Ángel Sánchez (footballer, born 1997), Spanish player for Salamanca CF
Ángel Sánchez (referee) (born 1957), Argentinian, former referee

Other people
Ángel Sánchez (fashion designer) (born 1960), Venezuelan fashion designer
Ángel Sánchez (infielder) (born 1983), Puerto Rican baseball coach and former shortstop
Ángel Sánchez (judoka) (born 1974), Cuban former judoka
Ángel Sánchez (pitcher) (born 1989), Dominican baseball pitcher

See also
Miguel Angel Sanchez (disambiguation)